The 1923 Arkansas Razorbacks football team represented the University of Arkansas in the Southwest Conference (SWC) during the 1923 college football season. In their second year under head coach Francis Schmidt, the Razorbacks compiled a 6–2–1 record (2–2 against SWC opponents), finished in fifth place in the SWC, and outscored their opponents by a combined total of 158 to 40.

Schedule

References

Arkansas
Arkansas Razorbacks football seasons
Arkansas Razorbacks football